John Bell (by 1508 – 1533/44), of Leominster, Herefordshire, was an English politician.

He was a Member (MP) of the Parliament of England for Leominster in 1529.

References

16th-century deaths
English MPs 1529–1536
People from Leominster
Year of birth uncertain